Hot House is an album by Steve Lacy and Mal Waldron released on the RCA Novus label in 1991. It features duo performances of tunes written by Herbie Nichols, Tadd Dameron, Bud Powell, Thelonious Monk. Sidney Bechet, Duke Ellington along with two compositions by Waldron and one by Lacy.

Reception
The Allmusic review by Chris Kelsey awarded the album 4.5 stars, stating: "Though certain gestures recur during the course of their improvisations, those gestures (the raw materials of improvisation) are smaller than those used by younger, less resourceful players. It's as if, instead of building a house made out of prefabricated materials, Lacy and Waldron cut down the trees, split the logs, plane the wood, and nail the boards together one by one. Of course, a Lacy/Waldron house is unlikely to look as slick as one of those prefab jobs, but it will be a much nicer place in which to live. And it's a heckuva a lot more likely to weather the test of time."

Track listing
 "House Party Starting" (Nichols) - 6:14
 "Hot House" (Dameron) - 4:13
 "I'll Keep Loving You" (Powell) - 9:17
 "Friday The 13th" (Monk) - 6:07
 "Mistral Breeze" (Waldron) - 3:33
 "The Mooche" (Ellington) - 5:55
 "Petite Fleur" (Bechet) - 7:04
 "Snake Out" (Waldron) - 6:39
 "Retreat" (Lacy) - 5:26

Recorded July 12–13, 1990 at Studios Ferber, Paris

Personnel
Steve Lacy - soprano saxophone
Mal Waldron - piano

References 

1991 albums
Steve Lacy (saxophonist) albums
Mal Waldron albums